John Favier (born 23 July 1960) is a former Australian rules footballer who played with St Kilda and the Sydney Swans in the Victorian Football League (VFL).

Favier was a half-back, recruited to St Kilda from Black Rock. 

He made 26 appearances for St Kilda, from 1982 to 1984, then in 1985 moved to Sydney, where he played two further league games. 

In 1986 he joined Frankston in the Victorian Football Association (VFA) and the following year had a fourth-place finish in the J. J. Liston Trophy.

He represented the VFA in interstate football.

References

External links

1960 births
Australian rules footballers from Victoria (Australia)
St Kilda Football Club players
Sydney Swans players
Frankston Football Club players
Living people